IHCH-7113 is a drug which acts as an agonist at the 5-HT2A serotonin receptor. It was derived by structural simplification of the 5-HT2A antagonist atypical antipsychotic drug lumateperone along with several related compounds such as IHCH-7079 and IHCH-7086, which were found to be nonhallucinogenic biased 5-HT2A agonists that were active in antidepressant assays but did not produce psychedelic-like responding in mice. IHCH-7113 however produced a head-twitch response comparable to that of DOI or LSD, which was blocked by the 5-HT2A antagonist MDL100907.

See also 
 AAZ-A-154
 Efavirenz
 Lisuride
 Mefloquine
 NDTDI
 RH-34
 SCHEMBL5334361
 WAY-163909

References 

Serotonin receptor agonists
Nitrogen heterocycles
Heterocyclic compounds with 4 rings